Shawn, Shaun, or Sean Elliott may refer to:

 Shawn Elliott (actor) (1937–2016), American actor and singer
 Shawn Elliott (American football) (born 1973), American football coach and defensive end
 Sean Elliott (born 1968), American basketball player
 Shaun Elliott (born 1957), English footballer

See also
DeShon Elliott (born 1997), American football safety